Péguilhan is a commune in the Haute-Garonne department in southwestern France in the historical region of Gascony. On 1 January 2017, the former commune of Lunax was merged into Péguilhan.

Péguilhan has far-reaching views towards the Pyrenees. It is surrounded by woodland and open countryside and a mixture of arable and livestock farming. Some houses in the area have been bought by British incomers, although the majority  in recent times have been Dutch and German.

Population

Personalities
It was possibly the birthplace of Aimeric de Peguilhan, a medieval troubadour, although this is debated.

Geography
The river Gesse flows northwards through the commune towards the market town of Boulogne-sur-Gesse; the Gimone forms most its western border.

Literature
Péguilhan is the setting for Martin Calder's travel memoir A Summer in Gascony, about life on a farm with a local Gascon family, centred on the inn at the end of the village. The book is set in the early 1990s and was published in 2008 by Nicholas Brealey publishing.

See also
Communes of the Haute-Garonne department

References

Communes of Haute-Garonne